The 1995 Tour de Suisse was the 59th edition of the Tour de Suisse cycle race and was held from 13 June to 22 June 1995. The race started in Bellinzona and finished in Zürich. The race was won by Pavel Tonkov of the Lampre team.

General classification

References

1995
Tour de Suisse